John Molchon (born February 2, 1997) is an American football guard for the Tampa Bay Buccaneers of the National Football League (NFL). He played college football at Boise State.

Early life and high school 
Molchon grew up in Las Vegas, Nevada and attended Faith Lutheran Middle School & High School in Summerlin. He was ranked #9 by ESPN overall in Nevada and he led the Crusaders to their first state title in 2013, later being named the NIAA Division 1-A linebacker of the year. In 2020, John Molchon had his number retired by Faith Lutheran Middle School & High School

College career 
Molchon redshirted his true freshman season. For his 2016 season he appeared in seven games, making three starts and was a semifinalist for the Joe Moore Award. In 2017 he appeared in all 14 games, making 13 starts and was part of a Bronco line for the Mountain West's No. 2 scoring offense (32.5 ppg). For his 2018 season he started all 13 games and was named to All-Mountain West First-team. In his 2019 senior he was named to All-Mountain West First-team for a second-straight season and was part of an offense that ranked 19th in the country in scoring.

Professional career 

Molchon signed a contract with the Tampa Bay Buccaneers as an undrafted free agent on April 25, 2020. He was placed on injured reserve on September 7, 2020. He was activated on October 30, 2020, but was waived the next day and re-signed to the practice squad on November 3. He was elevated to the active roster on November 28 for the team's week 12 game against the Kansas City Chiefs, and reverted to the practice squad after the game. On February 9, 2021, Molchon re-signed with the Buccaneers.

On September 2, 2021, Molchon was placed on injured reserve. He was activated on October 18, but waived the next day and re-signed to the practice squad. After the Buccaneers were eliminated in the Divisional Round of the 2021 playoffs, he signed a reserve/future contract on January 24, 2022.

On August 30, 2022, Molchon was waived by the Buccaneers and signed to the practice squad the next day. He was promoted to the active roster on November 2.

References

External links 
 Boise State Broncos football bio

1997 births
Living people
American football offensive guards
Boise State Broncos football players
Players of American football from Nevada
Sportspeople from Las Vegas
Tampa Bay Buccaneers players